Patrick Henry (1736–1799) was a Founding Father of the United States and of American Revolutionary War and governor of Virginia.

Patrick Henry may also refer to:

People
 Patrick Henry (U.S. Congressman) (1843-1930), American politician from Mississippi
 Patrick Henry (murderer) (1953–2017), French convicted child murderer
 Patrick T. Henry, U.S. Assistant Secretary of the Army (1998–2001)
 Patrick Henry (Florida politician) (born 1954)

Ships
 CSS Patrick Henry, a brigantine-rigged side-wheel steamer converted into a Confederate gunboat during the American Civil War
 SS Patrick Henry, the first World War II Liberty ship launched
 USS Patrick Henry (SSBN-599), a ballistic missile submarine of the United States Navy
 Patrick Henry (packet), a sailing ship between 1839 and 1864

Schools
 Patrick Henry College, a private Christian college in Purcellville, Virginia
 Patrick Henry High School (disambiguation)
 Patrick Henry Middle School (disambiguation)

Other uses
 Fort Patrick Henry, Vincennes, Indiana, an 18th-century fort
 Patrick Henry, one of the neighborhoods of Tulsa, Oklahoma
 Patrick Henry County, Virginia, a former county
 Camp Patrick Henry, Warwick County, Virginia, a decommissioned United States Army base
 Patrick Henry Building, Richmond, Virginia, on the National Register of Historic Places
 Patrick Henry Hotel, Roanoake, Virginia, a former hotel on the National Register of Historic Places
 Patrick Henry Mall, Newport News, Virginia, a shopping mall

See also
 Patrick Henry Village, a United States Army family housing area in the vicinity of Heidelberg, Germany
 Pat Henry (disambiguation)
 Patrick McHenry
 

Henry, Patrick